The 2009–10 Bowling Green Falcons men's ice hockey season was the Falcons' 41st season of varsity hockey and 39th in the Central Collegiate Hockey Association (CCHA). The Falcons finished the year as the eleventh place team in the CCHA and in the first round of the CCHA Hockey Tournament, they lost to the sixth seed Nebraska Omaha. The team was coached by Dennis Williams in his first and only season as the program's head coach.

Preseason 
Following the 2008–09 season, the future of the ice hockey program at Bowling Green State University was put into doubt. Blog and the local media began to report that the university was planning on cutting the ice hockey program to save money. The reports were met by much criticism from Bowling Green alumni and residents of Northwest Ohio. In late March 2009, Bowling Green president Dr. Carol A. Cartwright officially announced that a feasibility study of the 43-year-old ice arena and the hockey program would be conducted. Cartwright stated the outline of a plan to decide the future of the BGSU Ice Arena and to explore options facing the University's Intercollegiate Athletics Department. Cartwright has assigned Dr. Edward G. Whipple, BGSU vice president for student affairs, to lead the arena effort and Greg Christopher, director of intercollegiate athletics, to head the athletics review. Bowling Green's hockey program's first head coach, Jack Vivian, was announced as the head of the arena working group, as he was a long-time, national consultant on ice arena operations.

On July 22, 2009, Bowling Green and the Michigan Wolverines announced that they would play a game at the newly opened Lucas County Arena in downtown Toledo, Ohio on November 21.

On July 31, 2009, BGSU announced that it was committing $2.5 million to improvements to BGSU Ice Arena and that another $1.5 million was secured from the state of Ohio by state representative Randy Gardner and state senator Mark Wagoner to assist with renovation plans for the Falcons hockey team's home ice facility. Along with the money committed by BGSU and received from the state of Ohio, the program began to receive donations from supporters and alumni, including $250,000 from Jack and Elaine Vivian and former figure skater and Bowling Green native Scott Hamilton donated $500,000 to endow the Scott Hamilton Hockey Scholarship.

Coaching changes 
Head coach Scott Paluch would resign on June 30, 2009 and took up a position as regional manager for the United States National Developmental Team. In seven seasons as head coach at Bowling Green, Paluch compiled a record of 84–156–23. Paluch's assistant, Dennis Williams was named the interim coach for the 2009–10 season.

Players leaving 
Bowling Green would see many players leave the team during the offseason, starting with sophomore forward Dan Sexton, who signed a professional contract with the Anaheim Ducks. Freshman defenceman Dean Petiot, who had left Bowling Green during the 2008–09 season, signed with the Huntsville Havoc of the Southern Professional Hockey League Sophomore forward Jacob Cepis left Bowling Green and transferred to the University of Minnesota and began his career at Minnesota against Bowling Green on January 2, 2010. Freshman defenceman Nick Bailen withdrew from Bowling Green and re-signed with his junior team, the Indiana Ice of the United States Hockey League.

Regular season

Schedule 

Note: Points only applicable for conference games. The CCHA record is defined as W–L–T-SOW.
Source: 2009–10 BGSU Hockey Schedule

Standings

Playoffs

Roster 

Source:

Player stats

Skaters 

Source: 2009–10 BGSU Individual Statistics

Goaltenders 

Source: 2009–10 BGSU Individual Statistics

See also 
 2009–10 NCAA Division I men's ice hockey season

References

External links 
 Bowling Green Falcons men's ice hockey

Bowling Green
Bowling Green Falcons men's ice hockey seasons
Bowling Green Falcons men's ice hockey
Bowling Green Falcons men's ice hockey